"One weird trick" (also "one weird old tip", "one weird old trick" or other variants) advertisements are a form of clickbait online advertising that has been common on the Internet since around the late 2000s. The formula used in the advertisements was first applied to weight-loss products but has since been extended to cures for problems including hair loss and diabetes. A Federal Trade Commission (FTC) investigation found that many of the advertisements sold "trial" packages that were never sent. The FTC filed legal action in 2011 against promoters of such advertisements for defrauding millions of people.

See also
Chumbox, an advertising format often displaying "one weird trick" advertisements

References

Online advertising methods
Weight loss
Confidence tricks
2000s fads and trends